William Donovan Ard  (born March 12, 1959) is a former American football guard in the National Football League (NFL) for the New York Giants and Green Bay Packers. He played college football at Wake Forest University and was drafted in the eighth round of the 1981 NFL Draft. He won the Super Bowl with the Giants in 1987.

Ard grew up in Watchung, New Jersey, where he attended Watchung Hills Regional High School.  He lives in Watchung, New Jersey and works as a financial advisor at Morgan Stanley. Bill's other son, Brendan, broke records at his sport of choice, wrestling.

References

1959 births
Living people
American football offensive guards
Wake Forest Demon Deacons football players
New York Giants players
Green Bay Packers players
Sportspeople from East Orange, New Jersey
Watchung Hills Regional High School alumni
People from Watchung, New Jersey
People from Westfield, New Jersey
Sportspeople from Somerset County, New Jersey